Anjana Vasan (born 31 January 1987) is a Singaporean actress and singer-songwriter based in London. She is known for her stage work, earning Laurence Olivier and Evening Standard Theatre Award nominations, and her role in the Channel 4 sitcom We Are Lady Parts, for which she was nominated for a British Academy Television Award.

Early life and education
Vasan was born in Chennai, India to a Tamil family and moved to Singapore when she was four. She took theatre studies at the National University of Singapore before relocating to the United Kingdom, where she graduated in 2012 with a Master of Arts in Acting from the Royal Welsh College of Music & Drama.

Career
In 2011, Vasan made her television debut as Lauren in two episodes of the Channel 4 comedy-drama Fresh Meat. After completing drama school the following year, she had small roles in the National Theatre Wales production of The Radicalisation of Bradley Manning, the Royal Shakespeare Company production of Much Ado About Nothing, as well as Golgotha at the Tristan Bates Theatre in London.

Vasan played a witch in Kenneth Branagh's Macbeth at the Manchester International Festival and for its New York run at the Park Avenue Armory. She made her feature film debut with a small role in the live-action version of Cinderella (2015).

In 2018, Vasan played Zahra Alsaadi in the Channel 4 sitcom Hang Ups and had a role in the anthology film London Unplugged. She played Rosa in Summer and Smoke at the Almeida Theatre and Duke of York's Theatre, marking her West End debut. This was followed by roles Rutherford and Son at the National Theatre and A Doll's House at the Lyric Hammersmith, the latter of which earned her an Evening Standard Theatre Award nomination.

Vasan starred in the 2020 Riz Ahmed-written and starring drama film Mogul Mowgli. She then reprised her role from the 2018 short Lady Parts as lead guitar player Amina in We Are Lady Parts on Channel 4 in 2021. For her performance, Vasan received nominations at the British Academy Television Awards, Independent Spirit Awards, and Gotham Awards. She also appeared in Joe Wright's Cyrano.

Vasan joined the main cast of the BBC spy thriller Killing Eve for its fourth and final series as Pam. She returned to the stage as Stella in the London revival of A Streetcar Named Desire opposite Paul Mescal and Patsy Ferran. The production began at the Almeida in 2022 and will move to the West End's Phoenix Theatre in 2023. She has upcoming roles in the comedy film Wicked Little Letters and the sixth series of Black Mirror.

Filmography

Film

Television

Stage

Audio
 Goblin Market (BBC)
 The Man Who Wore Sanitary Pads (BBC)

Awards and nominations

Discography

Albums, EPs 

 Too Dark For Country (released 7 October 2017 - EP)
 Strange Country Jukebox (released 26 July 2021)

References

External links

Anjana Vasan at Bandcamp

Living people
21st-century Singaporean actresses
Actresses from Chennai
Alumni of the Royal Welsh College of Music & Drama
Indian emigrants to Singapore
Singaporean people of Tamil descent
Singaporean emigrants to the United Kingdom
Tamil actresses
1987 births